The Woman Tempted is a 1926 British silent drama film directed by Maurice Elvey and starring Juliette Compton, Warwick Ward and Nina Vanna. It was based on a novel by Vera, Countess Cathcart. The film was shot at Cricklewood Studios, and was backed by John Maxwell's Wardour Films which was dramatically increasing its role in the film industry. It was first given a trade show screening in June 1926, but did not go on full release until the following March. By that time Elvey had departed to work for Maxwell's rival Gaumont-British.

Premise
A young woman murders another woman whose behaviour drove her fiancé to suicide.

Cast
 Juliette Compton as Louise Harding 
 Warwick Ward as Jimmy Davies 
 Nina Vanna as Maud Edworth 
 Malcolm Tod as Basil Gilmore 
 Joan Morgan as Sybil Helmsley 
 Adeline Hayden Coffin as Mrs. Edworth 
 Judd Green

References

Bibliography
 Goble, Alan. The Complete Index to Literary Sources in Film. Walter de Gruyter, 1999.
 Low, Rachael. The History of the British Film 1918-1929. George Allen & Unwin, 1971.

External links

1926 films
British drama films
British silent feature films
1920s English-language films
Films directed by Maurice Elvey
Films based on British novels
British black-and-white films
1926 drama films
Films shot at Cricklewood Studios
1920s British films
Silent drama films